Sir Ernst Boris Chain  (19 June 1906 – 12 August 1979) was a German-born British biochemist best known for being a co-recipient of the Nobel Prize in Physiology or Medicine for his work on penicillin.

Life and career

Chain was born in Berlin, the son of Margarete and Michael Chain, a chemist and industrialist dealing in chemical products. His family was of both Sephardic and Ashkenazi Jewish descent. His father emigrated from Russia to study chemistry abroad and his mother was from Berlin. In 1930, he received his degree in chemistry from Friedrich Wilhelm University. His father descends from Zerahiah ben Shealtiel Ḥen who was a prominent figure among the Catalonian Jewry and whose ancestors were leading Jewish figures in Babylonia. He was a lifelong friend of Professor Albert Neuberger, whom he met in Berlin in the 1930s.

After the Nazis came to power, Chain understood that, being Jewish, he would no longer be safe in Germany. He left Germany and moved to England, arriving on 2 April 1933 with £10 in his pocket. Geneticist and physiologist J. B. S. Haldane helped him obtain a position at University College Hospital, London.

After a couple of months he was accepted as a PhD student at Fitzwilliam College, Cambridge, where he began working on phospholipids under the direction of Sir Frederick Gowland Hopkins. In 1935, he accepted a job at Oxford University as a lecturer in pathology. During this time he worked on a range of research topics, including snake venoms, tumour metabolism, lysozymes, and biochemistry techniques. Chain was naturalised as a British subject in April 1939.

In 1939, he joined Howard Florey to investigate natural antibacterial agents produced by microorganisms. This led him and Florey to revisit the work of Alexander Fleming, who had described penicillin nine years earlier. Chain and Florey went on to discover penicillin's therapeutic action and its chemical composition. Chain and Florey discovered how to isolate and concentrate the germ-killing agent in penicillin.  For this research, Chain, Florey, and Fleming received the Nobel Prize in 1945.

Along with Edward Abraham he was also involved in theorising the beta-lactam structure of penicillin in 1942, which was confirmed by X-ray crystallography done by Dorothy Hodgkin in 1945.
Towards the end of World War II, Chain learned his mother and sister had been killed by the Nazis. After World War II, Chain moved to Rome, to work at the Istituto Superiore di Sanità (Superior Institute of Health). He returned to Britain in 1964 as the founder and head of the biochemistry department at Imperial College London, where he stayed until his retirement, specialising in fermentation technologies.

On 17 March 1948 Chain was appointed a Fellow of the Royal Society.

In 1948, he married Anne Beloff, sister of Renee Beloff, Max Beloff, John Beloff and Nora Beloff, and a biochemist of significant standing herself. In his later life, his Jewish identity became increasingly important to him. Chain was an ardent Zionist and he became a member of the board of governors of the Weizmann Institute of Science at Rehovot in 1954, and later a member of the executive council. He raised his children securely within the Jewish faith, arranging much extracurricular tuition for them. His views were expressed most clearly in his speech 'Why I am a Jew' given at the World Jewish Congress Conference of Intellectuals in 1965.

Chain was appointed Knight Bachelor in the 1969 Birthday Honours.

Chain died in 1979 at the Mayo General Hospital in Castlebar, Ireland. The Imperial College London biochemistry building is named after him, as is a road in Castlebar.

See also
 List of Jewish Nobel laureates

References

Bibliography

External links

  including the Nobel Lecture, 20 March 1946 The Chemical Structure of the Penicillins
 
 

1906 births
1979 deaths
Nobel laureates in Physiology or Medicine
British Nobel laureates
Academics of Imperial College London
Fellows of Fitzwilliam College, Cambridge
20th-century German chemists
Jewish chemists
Jewish creationists
Jewish emigrants from Nazi Germany to the United Kingdom
Knights Bachelor
People of Sephardic-Jewish descent
Fellows of the Royal Society
Members of the French Academy of Sciences
German humanitarians
Naturalised citizens of the United Kingdom
British humanitarians
British people of Russian-Jewish descent
Beloff family
Recipients of the Order of the Rising Sun, 2nd class
British expatriates in Italy
Physicians of the Charité